This list of churches in Næstved Municipality lists church buildings in Næstved Municipality, Denmark.

List

See also
 Listed buildings in Næstved Municipality
 List of churches in Slagelse Municipality

References

External links

 Nordens kirker: Nordvestsjælland

 
Naestved